Tonino Nardi (25 September 1939 – 24 October 1993) was an Italian film cinematographer.

Life and career 
Born in Pisa Nardi debuted as a cinematographer in 1973, for the Gianni Amelio's debut film La città del sole, and since then he was a stable collaborator of Amelio in his following works. He also worked with other established directors such as Elio Petri, Mario Monicelli, Peter Del Monte, Marco Bellocchio 

In 1990, Nardi was awarded best cinematographer at the 3rd edition of the European Film Awards for Amelio's Open Doors.

Selected filmography     
 Il gabbiano (1977)
 Good News (1979)
 Blow to the Heart (1983)
 Il diavolo sulle colline (1985)
 Piccoli fuochi (1985)
 The Rogues  (1987)
 Regina (1987)
 Vampire in Venice (1988)
 Domino  (1988)
 I ragazzi di via Panisperna  (1989)
 Open Doors (1990)
 The Stolen Children (1992) 
 Dear Goddamned Friends (1993)

References

External links 
 

 

1939 births 
1993 deaths 
European Film Award for Best Cinematographer winners
Italian cinematographers
People from Pisa